Aethionema subulatum is a species of stonecress which is native to Turkey.

Description

References

subulatum